The terms green-skinned train and green train refer to a type of design which used to be the mainstay of the passenger railway fleets of China and other communist countries during the Cold War. These words carry connotations of slow travel on old vehicles with few amenities, most notably lacking air conditioning. Despite these connotations, some newer trains have been painted green for nostalgic purposes.

Gallery

China

Green-skinned trains in China traditionally referred to the class of "普通旅客快车" (Regional fast train) and "普通旅客列车" (Regional slow train).

Original

Modern

Other countries

Asia

USSR

Eastern Europe

References

Rolling stock of China
Rail liveries